Lawton railway station is a disused railway station in Cheshire, England.

The line opened in 1852 to serve the salt and chemical works in the Sandbach area and passenger services were a very late addition, not being introduced until 1893, 41 years after the opening of the line.

The station called Lawton, which was close to the settlement at Lawton Gate was one of two intermediate station on the line opened at the same time in July 1893, a third  was opened in 1905.  From the station to Lawton Junction, the junction with the Crewe-Harecastle line the line was double tracked, from Lawton to Hassall Green the line was only single track.

There were minimal goods facilities at the station and the station had an island platform with the buildings on the platform between the two running lines.

Freight traffic continued over the line until 1964 and the line was finally closed and lifted in 1971.

References
Notes

Sources
 
 
 

Disused railway stations in Cheshire
Former North Staffordshire Railway stations
Railway stations in Great Britain closed in 1930
Railway stations in Great Britain opened in 1893